The Austria national roller hockey team is the national team side of Austria at international roller hockey. Usually is part of FIRS Roller Hockey B World Cup and CERH European Roller Hockey Championship.

Austria squad - 2010 FIRS Roller Hockey B World Cup 

Team Staff
 General Manager:Karl-Heinz Speiser
 General Manager:

Coaching Staff
 Head Coach: Stefan Reichen
 Assistant:

References

External links
Official website of Austria Roller Sports Federation

National Roller Hockey Team
Roller Hockey
National roller hockey (quad) teams